Nicolae Ionescu (12 June 1949 – 25 July 1997) was a Romanian footballer who played as a midfielder.

International career
Nicolae Ionescu played four games at international level for Romania, making his debut when coach Angelo Niculescu sent him on the field at half-time in order to replace Augustin Deleanu in a friendly which ended with a 2–0 victory against France. His following two games were also friendlies, a 3–3 against Italy and a 1–1 against Austria. Nicolae Ionescu's last game for the national team was a 1–1 against Finland at the 1974 World Cup qualifiers.

References

External links
Nicolae Ionescu at labtof.ro

1949 births
1997 deaths
Romanian footballers
Romania international footballers
Association football midfielders
Liga I players
Liga II players
FC Petrolul Ploiești players
FC Steaua București players
CSO Plopeni players
People from Aninoasa